Silver Jew is a 2007 documentary film by Michael Tully and Matthew Robison about the musician David Berman and his band Silver Jews. Shot in just three days with no production budget, the film chronicles the band's stop in Israel to play two shows in Tel Aviv and visit Jerusalem during their first ever world tour in the summer of 2006.

It was released on DVD by Drag City on September 23, 2008. Bonus features include an annotated slideshow, along with music videos for the songs "I'm Getting Back Into Getting Back Into You" and "Let's Not And Say We Did".

References

External links 

 
Silver Jew at MySpace
Silver Jew at Drag City
"Silver Jew (2007)" at YouTube. Accessed 9 December 2018.

2007 films
American documentary films
Documentary films about rock music and musicians
Direct-to-video documentary films
2000s English-language films
2000s American films